The Stage Awards for Acting Excellence are a set of Scottish theatre awards which were established in 1995 to recognise outstanding theatre performances by individuals and companies on the Edinburgh Festival Fringe. 

Organised by the theatrical newspaper The Stage, the initial award categories of Best Actor and Best Actress were joined by a Best Ensemble award in 1998. In 2006, an award for Best Solo Show was given for the first time.

Award winners are chosen by a panel consisting of the newspaper's principal Fringe reviewers and are usually announced in a ceremony on the last Sunday of the Fringe Festival. There have been only two Joint Winners awarded, in 1998 and 1999.

Award winners

Best Actor 
 1995: Mark Pinkosh for Road Movie
 1996: Edward Halstead for Bartleby
 1997: John Stahl for Anna Weiss
 1998: Chris Pickles for Love! Valour! Compassion!
 1999: Tony Cownie for A Madman Sings to the Moon
 2000: Greig Coetzee for White Men with Weapons
 2001: Guy Masterson for Fern Hill and Other Dylan Thomas
 2002: David Calvitto for Horse Country
 2003: Richard Dormer for Hurricane
 2004: James Urbaniak for Thom Pain (based on nothing)
 2005: Phil Nichol for Edward Albee's The Zoo Story
 2006: Paul Sparks for Finer Noble Gases
 2007: Garry Cooper for "Long Time Dead"
 2008: Ciaran McIntyre for "Deep Cut"
 2009: Billy Mack for The Sound of My Voice
 2010: Scott Kyle for Singin' I'm No a Billy He's a Tim
 2011: Billy Mack for The Overcoat
 2012: Bill Patterson for And No More Shall We Part
 2013: 
 2014: 
 2015: 
 2016: 
 2017:

Best Actress 
 1995: Lynn Ferguson for Heart and Sole
 1996: Beth Fitzgerald for The House of Correction
 1997: Eileen Walsh for Disco Pig
 1998: Siobhan Redmond for Perfect Days + Alison Jean Baker for The Glace Bay Miner's Museum - Joint Winners
 1999: Jacqueline Linke for Often I Find That I Am Naked
 2000: Paola Dionisotti for Further Than the Furthest Thing
 2001: Nichola McAuliffe for Bed Among the Lentils
 2002: Sandy McDade for Iron
 2003: Cait Davis for Those Eyes, That Mouth
 2004: Pauline Goldsmith for Samuel Beckett's Not I
 2005: Saskia Schuck for Cage
 2006: Caroline O'Connor for Over The Rainbow
 2007: Eugenia Caruso and Janet Bamford for Truckstop
 2008: Rhian Blythe for Deep Cut
 2009: Cora Bissett for Midsummer (A Play With Songs)
 2011: Alessija Lause for Danny And The Deep Blue Sea
 2012: Nichola McAuliffe for Maurice’s Jubilee
 2013: 
 2014: 
 2015: 
 2016: 
 2017:

Best Ensemble 
 1998: Theatre 28 for Love! Valour! Compassion!
 1999: The East company for Steven Berkoff's East (the 25th anniversary production) + Kaos Theatre UK for The Kaos Importance of Being Earnest - Joint Winners
 2000: Grid Iron Theatre Company for Decky Does a Bronco
 2001: Theatre O for 3 Dark Tales
 2002: Bomb-itty International for The Bomb-itty of Errors
 2003: 78th Street Theatre Lab and Paper Hat Productions for Boy Steals Train
 2004: Grid Iron Theatre Company for Fierce: An Urban Myth
 2005: The Corn Exchange, Ireland for Dublin by Lamplight
 2006: National Theatre of Scotland for Black Watch
 2007: The Shalimar for La Femme Est Morte or Why I Should Not F%!# My Son
 2008: Live Theatre for Motherland
 2009: Green Shoot Productions for Chronicles of Long Kesh
 2010: 
 2011: 
 2012: Caroline Horton Company for Mess
 2013: 
 2014: Guy Masterson & Tumanishvili Film Actors Theatre Company for Animal Farm
 2015: 
 2016: 
 2017:

Best Solo Show 
 2006: Daniel Kitson for C-90
 2007: Madi Distefano for Popsicle’s Departure 1989
 2008: Matthew Zajac for The Tailor of Inverness
 2009: George Mann for Odyssey
 2010: 
 2011: Gerard Logan for The Rape Of Lucrece
 2012: Silvia Gallerano for The Sh*t/La Merda
 2013: 
 2014: 
 2015: 
 2016: 
 2017:

References 

British theatre awards
Scottish awards